Kenneth Nkosi (born 19 June 1973) is a South African actor and comedian.  He portrayed Aap in the 2005 film Tsotsi (2005).  He also appeared in the films White Wedding (2009) and Otelo Burning (2011), as well as Mad Buddies (2012) and Five Fingers for Marseilles (2017). In July 2011, along with Rapulana Seiphemo, he acted on Paradise Stop short film with Rapulana Seiphemo, joined The Queen - portraying the role of Jaros.

Select filmography
Max and Mona (2004)
Tsotsi (2005)
Gangster's Paradise: Jerusalema (2008)
White Wedding (2009)
District 9 (2009)
Otelo Burning (2011)
Skeem (2011)
Mad Buddies (2012)
Nothing for Mahala (2013)
Freedom (2018)
Five Fingers for Marseilles (2017)
Piet's Sake (2022)
''Reyka (TV series, 2021)

Awards and nominations

South African Film and Television Awards

References

External links
 

Living people
South African male film actors
21st-century South African male actors
South African male comedians
1973 births